Peter Kenneth Gethin (21 February 1940 – 5 December 2011) was a British racing driver from England. He participated in 31 World Championship Formula One Grands Prix, debuting on 21 June 1970. He won the 1971 Italian Grand Prix in the fastest average speed in Formula One history, but this was his only podium finish. Gethin also participated in numerous non-Championship Formula One races, winning the 1971 World Championship Victory Race and the 1973 Race of Champions.

Gethin also raced for Team McLaren in the 1970 Canadian-American Challenge Cup series, driving the McLaren M8D that had been driven by Dan Gurney in the first three races of the season. Gethin won one race and finished third in the 1970 championship. In 1974 Gethin won the Tasman Series, a Formula 5000 series held in Australia and New Zealand. Gethin drove a Chevron B24 Chevrolet. Gethin later ran a Formula 3000 team.

Career

McLaren driver

1970
Gethin made his debut in F1 for McLaren at the 1970 Dutch Grand Prix, replacing the team's founder, Bruce McLaren, who had been killed at the Goodwood Circuit earlier in the month. He joined a three car team which also included Andrea de Adamich and Dan Gurney. He qualified strongly at Zandvoort, taking 11th, 2.110s behind Jochen Rindt's pole time for Lotus. He was nine-tenths of a second ahead of his more illustrious but ageing teammate Gurney. He engaged in a good fight early in the race with Henri Pescarolo's Matra, but soon got the better of the Frenchman and was still running in 10th when he had an accident on lap 19.

Gethin missed the French and British Grands Prix, as former McLaren legend and 1967 world champion Denny Hulme drove the car, but he returned for the German Grand Prix. He qualified less impressively, being only 17th, and a tenth of a second behind Hulme, who had remained with the team on Gethin's return at the expense of Gurney. It was a disappointing race, as Gethin dropped to the back early on and retired after just 3 laps with a throttle failure.

The Austrian Grand Prix at the Österreichring was next, and it was another disappointing qualifying session for Gethin, who was down in 21st and comprehensively trounced by his teammates Hulme and de Adamich. As other drivers fell by the wayside in the race, however, Gethin climbed consistently up the order, and was running as high as 8th before he was passed by Ignazio Giunti's Ferrari and Jo Siffert's March late on, but it was his first grand prix finish as he came home 10th.

Gethin was again the rearmost of the McLaren cars at Monza for the Italian Grand Prix, but it was an improved performance, as he was 17th and as close as he had been to the pole time, 2.050 seconds behind Jacky Ickx's Ferrari. He started well in the race and was quickly up to 13th after good passes on teammate de Adamich and Ronnie Peterson's March. However, both Gethin and de Adamich soon suffered technical problems, and dropped to the back of the field, where they would stay until the end of the race, apart from brief periods ahead of Giunti and Tim Schenken's De Tomaso when they were experiencing their own problems. Due to the sheer attrition of the race, de Adamich was 8th at the end and Gethin 9th, although the Englishman was 8 laps down and therefore not classified.

The Canadian Grand Prix at Mont-Tremblant saw the season leave Europe and head towards its finale in the Americas, and it saw a resurgence in Gethin's form, as he out-qualified both de Adamich and Hulme, coming 11th just 1.7 seconds behind Jackie Stewart's pole time. He played the race strategy well, and did not have to make any moves on the track, save one against Pescarolo. He was behind Hulme for a while, but the Kiwi retired with wheel problems. This left Gethin free to take 6th and his first points in F1.

Hoping to continue this form, they arrived in Watkins Glen for the United States Grand Prix. It appeared that Gethin's Canada pace had not been carried over, as he was back behind Hulme and in 21st on the grid, 3.05 seconds behind Ickx on pole, although he was ahead of de Adamich. He raced strongly in the first half of the race, crucially getting ahead of the Brabhams of Jack Brabham and Rolf Stommelen, but both were able to pass him before too long. Tim Schenken and Clay Regazzoni, who was recovering from technical problems, also exposed his deficiencies in racecraft, leaving him 14th and last, and this was where he finished, 8 laps down on winner Emerson Fittipaldi in the Lotus.

The season concluded with the Mexican Grand Prix at the Autódromo Hermanos Rodríguez in Mexico City, and Gethin was back on form, qualifying a season best 10th, over half a second ahead of Hulme. He raced strongly again, keeping the faster car of 1964 world champion John Surtees, in the car bearing his name, behind for a number of laps. However, the McLaren's reliability issues reared their ugly head again, and he slowed and finally stopped with engine failure on lap 28.

The season ended with Gethin in 23rd in the world championship, with just 1 solitary point earned in Canada.

1971
Gethin remained with McLaren for 1971, in a team now reduced to two cars, with Gethin partnering Hulme for another year. The first qualifying session at Kyalami went badly for the Englishman, who finished the session 11th, half a second behind his more illustrious teammate and 1.8 seconds behind pole man Jackie Stewart, driving for Tyrrell. In a race where Hulme was only denied victory by suspension problems four laps from the end, Gethin dropped back very quickly and retired just 7 laps in with a fuel leak.

The Montjuïc Circuit was the venue for the Spanish Grand Prix, which was next on the calendar. Gethin took a career best 7th, only 0.9 seconds behind Jacky Ickx's Ferrari on pole and over three-tenths ahead of Hulme. He fast dropped behind Hulme and the second Ferrari of Mario Andretti, and when things straightened out he was down in 10th, behind François Cevert's Tyrrell and the Lotus of Emerson Fittipaldi as well. However, the retirements of Andretti and Fittipaldi left him 8th, which is where he finished the race – depressingly he had been comfortably outperformed by Hulme, who had taken 5th.

Gethin's first appearance at Monaco which was the next challenge, and Gethin did not impress in qualifying, being down in 14th, 1.6 seconds behind Hulme and almost four seconds behind Stewart's pole time. He dropped a further place on the first lap, to Rolf Stommelen's Surtees. He gradually gained places, however, due to others' retirements and a good overtake on John Surtees. He ran as high as 11th before he hit the barriers on lap 23.

He won the 1971 Italian Grand Prix with the fastest average speed in Formula One history (until the record was broken by Michael Schumacher in the same race in ), but this was his only podium finish. There was only 0.01 seconds between him and second placed Ronnie Peterson, also a record. Indeed, he never led an entire lap of Formula One racing, as he passed from fourth to first in the last lap.

Death
Gethin died at the age of 71 in December 2011 after a long illness.

Racing record

Complete European Formula Two Championship results
(key) (Races in bold indicate pole position; races in italics indicate fastest lap.)

Complete British Saloon Car Championship results
(key) (Races in bold indicate pole position; races in italics indicate fastest lap.)

Complete European F5000 Championship results
(key) (Races in bold indicate pole position; races in italics indicate fastest lap.)

Complete Formula One World Championship results
(key)

Non-Championship results
(key) (Races in bold indicate pole position; races in italics indicate fastest lap.)

References

Sources
Profile at www.grandprix.com

External links

 

1940 births
2011 deaths
English racing drivers
English Formula One drivers
McLaren Formula One drivers
BRM Formula One drivers
Hill Formula One drivers
Formula One race winners
European Formula Two Championship drivers
Tasman Series drivers
People from Ewell